Bharat Bhushan Batra (born 4 May 1952) is an Indian politician serving as the MLA from Rohtak in the Haryana Legislative Assembly since 2019. He held the post previously from 2009 to 2014.

Personal life 
Batra was born on 4 May 1952 to Sat Ram Dass Batra in Kalanaur town of Haryana. He obtained his Bachelor of Arts degree in Kalanaur and LLB from Delhi University in 1977. He is married to Neelam Batra, with whom he has a son.

Political career
Batra was first elected as the Member of Legislative Assembly from Rohtak Vidhan Sabha constituency in 2009, defeating Bharatiya Janata Party's Manish Grover by 19,595 votes, succeeding fellow Congress politician Shadi Lal Batra. During his tenure, he was the chairman of Library Committee, Petition Committee and Subject Committee on Education, Technical Education, Vocation Education, Medical Education and Health Services.

In the 2014 Haryana Legislative Assembly election, Batra lost to Grover with 11,132 votes. But, regained his seat in 2019, this time defeating the latter with 19,595 votes.

Batra was the chief whip of Indian National Congress in Haryana Vidhan Sabha from 2010 to 2014 and 2019 to present.

References 

1952 births
Living people
Haryana MLAs 2019–2024
People from Rohtak district
Indian National Congress politicians from Haryana